Euleptes is a genus of geckos represented by the European leaf-toed gecko (Euleptes europaea), the sole extant species.

Two extinct species are known from the Miocene of the Czech Republic and Slovakia; E. gallica and E. klembarai.

References

See also
Geiseleptes

Geckos
Reptile genera with one living species